Litslits is a town in Vanuatu, in Malampa Province, on the island of Malekula. It is south of the city Lakatoro, with 1,391 inhabitants (2013). In the village, a marina was built, which serves for a convenient passenger connection with the Malekula island. Every week there is a fast passenger catamaran, operated by Fresh Cargo, with seats for about 60 people.

References 

Populated places in Vanuatu
Malampa Province